Windfall, also released as Dangerous Money, is a 1955 British comedy film directed by Henry Cass and starring Lionel Jeffries, Jack Watling and Gordon Jackson. It was written by John Gilling.

Premise
The lives of shop assistant Arthur Lee and his family are transformed when he finds £2,000 on top of a bus.  Arthur's daughter's dodgy boy friend steals the money, but lands in trouble when it's discovered to be counterfeit. Things turn out well for Arthur when the resulting publicity gives a boost to his business.

Cast
 Lionel Jeffries as Arthur Lee
 Jack Watling as John Lee
 Gordon Jackson as Leonard
 Avice Landone as Mary Lee
 Brian Worth as Michael Collins
 Patricia Owens as Connie Lee
 Cyril Chamberlain as Clarkson

References

External links
 

1955 films
1955 comedy films
British comedy films
Films directed by Henry Cass
1950s English-language films
1950s British films
British black-and-white films